Kee may refer to:

Business 
Kee Games, a former arcade game manufacturer
Knowledge Engineering Environment, a frame-based development tool for Expert Systems
Kee Wah Bakery, a chain of bakery stores in Hong Kong, Taiwan, and the United Statesco)

Events  
K-T Extinction Event, mass extinction of some three-quarters of the plant and animal species on Earth that occurred approximately 66 million years ago
Kee Scarp Formation, a geologic formation in Northwest Territories

Places 
Kalleh-ye Espid-e Eslamabad, village in  Khash County, Sistan and Baluchestan Province, Iran
KEE, the IATA code for the Congolese Kelle Airport

People 
Kinnda (born 1982), Kinnda Hamid, a Swedish artist and songwriter, also known as Kee
Kee, a surname romanized in Hokkien
Kee Marcello (born 1960), Swedish guitarist
Kanzy Emad El Defrawy (born 1994), Egyptian squash player
Karl Egon Ebert (1801–1882), Bohemian German poet, born in Prague
Khalid El Ebrahim (born 1992), Kuwaiti footballer who currently plays for Al-Qadsia as a defender
Katharine Emily Eggar (1874–1961), English pianist and composer
Kjell Egil Eimhjellen (born 1928), Norwegian microbiologist
Kajsa Ekis Ekman (born 1980), Swedish journalist, writer and activist
Khaled El Emam, founder and CEO of Privacy Analytics
Knut Einar Eriksen (born 1944), Norwegian historian
Katherine Elizabeth Espín (born 1993), Ecuadorian model and beauty pageant titleholder
Kee Chang Huang (1917–1998), professor at the University of Louisville
Kee Thuan Chye (born 1954), Malaysian actor, dramatist, poet and journalist
Kee MacFarlane (born 1947), director of Children's Institute International
Kee Sloan (born 1955), the eleventh and current bishop of the Diocese of Alabama
Kee Kim Swee (1863–?), Chinese nationality (Hainanese) who settled in Tawau, Sabah
John P. Kee (born 1962), American gospel singer and pastor.
Terry P. Kee (born 1963), associated professor in chemistry at University of Leeds, specialising in astrochenistry.

Educational institutions
Kee Business College, the former name of a for-profit college with branches in Chesapeake and Newport News, Virginia
Kee High School, an Allamakee County secondary school located in Lansing, Iowa, US

Films
Kee (film), an Indian Tamil-language film

Others  
Katherine Emery Estate, a historic house located at 1155 Oak Grove Avenue in San Marino, California
Kee Klamp, a structural pipe fitting commonly used in the construction of handrails and barriers
Kee House (disambiguation)

Warfare
Kee Bird, a United States Army Air Forces Boeing B-29 Superfortress, serial 45-21768, of the 46th Reconnaissance Squadron
Kee Lung-class destroyer, series of four warships based on the Spruance class destroyers

See also